Henry Armetta (born Enrico Armetta; July 4, 1888 – October 21, 1945) was an American character actor who appeared in at least 150 American films, beginning in silent movies. His last film was released posthumously in 1946, the year after his death.

Biography
Armetta was born in Palermo, Sicily, Italy. At the age of 14, he stowed away on a boat to America. The immigration authorities were prepared to send him back, but he found an Italian family to act as his sponsor. He settled in New York City where he delivered groceries, sold sandwiches and pizzas and performed other menial tasks to get by. He eventually ended up working as a pants presser at a well known club where he was befriended by actor/producer Raymond Hitchcock. Hitchcock got him a chorus part in his play A Yankee Consul.

After a friend told him about southern California's mushrooming film industry, Armetta hitchhiked to Hollywood in 1920 and soon found work in films as a stereotypical Italian, often playing a barber, grocer or restaurant owner. He went on to appear in over 152 films (at least 24 films in 1934 alone), often uncredited. Armetta appeared in several films for Metro-Goldwyn-Mayer including Romance (1930) starring Greta Garbo, What! No Beer? (1933) with Buster Keaton and Jimmy Durante,  Everybody Sing (1938) featuring Judy Garland, Allan Jones, and Fanny Brice, The Big Store (1941) opposite the Marx Brothers, and a much thinner Armetta was briefly glimpsed in one of his last appearances in the MGM Technicolor musical Anchors Aweigh (1945) with Frank Sinatra and Gene Kelly. He died the same year of a heart attack in San Diego. He is buried at Holy Cross Cemetery in Culver City, California.

Selected filmography

 The Plunderer (1915) – Pedro
 The Marble Heart (1916)
 The Eternal Sin (1917) – The Jester
 The Jungle Trail (1919) – Grogas
 The Face at Your Window (1920) – Danglo
 Fantômas (1920, Serial) – The Wop
 The Silent Command (1923) – Pedro
 The Desert's Price (1925) – Shepherd
 The Missing Link (1927) – Organ Grinder
 7th Heaven (1927) – Minor Role (uncredited)
 Paid to Love (1927) – Valet (uncredited)
 A Girl in Every Port (1928) – Bartender in Panama (uncredited)
 Street Angel (1928) – Masetto
 Lonesome (1928) – Ferris wheel guy (uncredited)
 The Red Dance (1928) – Prisoner (uncredited)
 Homesick (1928) – Bicycle Rider
 In Old Arizona (1928) – Barber (uncredited)
 Lady of the Pavements (1929) – Papa Pierre
 Madame X (1929) – Hotel Owner (uncredited)
 Half Marriage (1929) – Henry – Hot Dog Vendor (uncredited)
 Jazz Heaven (1929) – Tony
 Love, Live and Laugh (1929) – Tony
 The Trespasser (1929) – Barber (uncredited)
 Sunny Side Up (1929) – Italian Husband (uncredited)
 The Climax (1930) – Anton Donatelli
 The Ship from Shanghai (1930) – Sailor (uncredited)
 A Lady to Love (1930) – Angelo
 The Girl Said No (1930) – Grove Cafe Waiter (uncredited)
 Lovin' the Ladies (1930) – Signore Sagatelli
 Ladies Love Brutes (1930) – Tony, the Waiter (uncredited)
 Die Sehnsucht jeder Frau (1930) – Angelo
 The Sins of the Children (1930) – Tony the Barber
 The Little Accident (1930) – Rudolpho Amendelara
 Romance (1930) – Beppo
 Sei tu l'amore (1930) – The exporter
 La mujer X (1931) – Minor Role (uncredited)
 A Tailor Made Man (1931) – Peter, Tailor
 Strangers May Kiss (1931) – Waiter
 Laughing Sinners (1931) – Tony (uncredited)
 Just a Gigolo (1931) – Hotel Manager (uncredited)
 Five and Ten (1931) – Taxi Driver (uncredited)
 Hush Money (1931) – Bootlegger (uncredited)
 New Adventures of Get Rich Quick Wallingford (1931) – Henry – Barber (uncredited)
 The Unholy Garden (1931) – Nick the Goose
 Forbidden (1932) – Emile (uncredited)
 High Pressure (1932) – Italian Investor (uncredited)
 The Passionate Plumber (1932) – Bouncer
 Arsène Lupin (1932) – Sheriff's Man
 Steady Company (1932) – Tony Capri
 Scarface (1932) – Pietro – Barber (uncredited)
 Doomed Battalion (1932) – Angelo
 Huddle (1932) – Mr. Amatto
 Week Ends Only (1932) – Washroom Attendant
 Red-Headed Woman (1932) – Waiter Warning Bill of Lipstick (uncredited)
 Bachelor's Affairs (1932) – Tony – Cosmetician (uncredited)
 Speak Easily (1932) – Tony
 Okay, America! (1932) – Sam
 Hat Check Girl (1932) – Water Wagon Driver (uncredited)
 Deception (1932) – Nick
 Prosperity (1932) – Henry, a Barber
 Men of America (1932) – Tony Garboni
 Uptown New York (1932) – Nick – Restaurant Proprietor (uncredited)
 A Farewell to Arms (1932) – Bonello – Italian Ambulance Driver (uncredited)
 Central Park (1932) – Tony, Hot Dog Vendor (uncredited)
 They Just Had to Get Married (1932) – Tony
 Rasputin and the Empress (1932) – Photographer (uncredited)
 What! No Beer? (1933) – Tony
 The Cohens and Kellys in Trouble (1933) – Captain Silva
 So This Is Africa (1933) – Street Cleaner (uncredited)
 Fra Diavolo (1933) – Matteo
 Don't Bet on Love (1933) – Caparillo, Barber (uncredited)
 Laughing at Life (1933) – Fruit Vendor
 Her First Mate (1933) – Socrates
 Too Much Harmony (1933) – Mr. Gallotti
 Cross Country Cruise (1934) – The Italian
 The Poor Rich (1934) – Tony
 The Cat and the Fiddle (1934) – Taxi Driver
 Viva Villa! (1934) – Alfredo Mendosa
 The Black Cat (1934) – The Sergeant
 Half a Sinner (1934) – The Barber
 Let's Talk It Over (1934) – Tony
 Kiss and Make-Up (1934) – Banquet Chairman
 Romance in the Rain (1934) – Tulio
 Hide-Out (1934) – Shuman
 Gift of Gab (1934) – Janitor
 Embarrassing Moments (1934) – Morganza
 One Night of Love (1934) – Cafe Owner (uncredited)
 Wake Up and Dream (1934) – Giovanni Cellini
 Two Heads on a Pillow (1934) – Enrico Populopulini
 The Merry Widow (1934) – Turk (uncredited)
 Imitation of Life (1934) – The Painter
 Cheating Cheaters (1934) – Prof. Tony Verdi
 The Man Who Reclaimed His Head (1934) – Laurent
 After Office Hours (1935) – Italian Diner Owner
 Night Life of the Gods (1935) – Roigi
 I've Been Around (1935) – Italian
 Straight from the Heart (1935) – Ice Cream Man
 Princess O'Hara (1935) – Spidoni
 Dinky (1935) – Tony Karamazo – the Junkman
 Unknown Woman (1935) – Joe Scalise
 Manhattan Moon (1935) – Tony
 Three Kids and a Queen (1935) – Tony Orsatti
 Magnificent Obsession (1935) – Tony
 Let's Sing Again (1936) – Joe Pasquale
 Poor Little Rich Girl (1936) – Tony
 The Crime of Dr. Forbes (1936) – Luigi
 Two in a Crowd (1936) – Toscani
 The Magnificent Brute (1936) – Buzell
 Top of the Town (1937) – Bacciagalluppi
 Make a Wish (1937) – Moreta
 Manhattan Merry-Go-Round (1937) – Spadoni
 Everybody Sing (1938) – Signor Vittorino
 Speed to Burn (1938) – Papa Gambini
 Submarine Patrol (1938) – Luigi
 Road Demon (1938) – Papa Luigi Gambini
 Fisherman's Wharf (1939) – Beppo
 Winner Take All (1939) – Papa Luigi Gambini
 The Lady and the Mob (1939) – Zambrogio
 I Stole a Million (1939) – Nick
 Dust Be My Destiny (1939) – Nick
 Rio (1939) – Headwaiter (uncredited)
 The Escape (1939) – Guiseppi Peronni
 Boss Foreman (1939)
 Three Cheers for the Irish (1940) – Tony
 The Man Who Talked Too Much (1940) – Tony Spirella
 You're Not So Tough (1940) – Salvatore
 We Who Are Young (1940) – Tony
 Caught in the Act (1941) – Mike Ripportella
 The Big Store (1941) – Guiseppi
 Slick Chick (1941)
 Stage Door Canteen (1943) – Himself
 Good Luck, Mr. Yates (1943) – Mike Zaloris
 Thank Your Lucky Stars (1943) – Angelo the Barber (uncredited)
 Once Upon a Time (1944) – Barber (uncredited)
 Ghost Catchers (1944) – Signatelli (uncredited)
 Allergic to Love (1944) – Louie
 A Bell for Adano (1945) – Errante – Cart Man
 Penthouse Rhythm (1945) – Cafe Owner Joe
 Anchors Aweigh (1945) – Hamburger Man
 Colonel Effingham's Raid (1946) – Jimmy Economy (final film role)

References

External links

 
 
 

1888 births
1945 deaths
American male film actors
American male silent film actors
Burials at Holy Cross Cemetery, Culver City
Italian emigrants to the United States
Male actors from Palermo
20th-century American male actors